Máire R. M. Herbert , also known as Mary Herbert, is an Irish historian and academic, specialising in early medieval Irish history and Irish saints. She is Emeritus Professor of Early and Medieval Irish at University College Cork, and was previously the head of its Scoil Léann Na Gaeilge (School of Irish Learning).

Biography
Herbert pursued Celtic Studies at University College, Galway, taking a Bachelor of Arts (BA) degree in 1968 followed by a Master of Arts (MA) degree in 1970. She was appointed scholar at the School of Celtic Studies within the Dublin Institute for Advanced Studies in October 1970 and researched there for two years until 1972. She later undertook further postgraduate studies as a visiting fellow at Clare Hall, University of Cambridge, completing her research there in 1975  and officially awarded her Doctor of Philosophy (PhD) degree in 1985. Her doctoral thesis was titled "The monastic paruchia of Colum Cille in pre-Norman Ireland: its history and hagiography". Thereafter, Professor Herbert pursued a distinguished academic career in both teaching and research within the National University of Ireland, initially at Maynooth University and then for many years at University College Cork. She has been Visiting Professor at a number of overseas universities and has authored numerous publications.

Honours
In 1996, Herbert was elected a Member of the Royal Irish Academy (MRIA), the premier all-Ireland learned society. In 2015, a Festschrift was published in her honour. In 2018, she was awarded the Derek Allen Prize (Celtic Studies) by the British Academy "for her outstanding contribution to the study of Celtic literature and history".

Selected works

References

Year of birth missing (living people)
Living people
Academics of University College Cork
Alumni of the University of Galway
Alumni of the University of Cambridge
20th-century Irish historians
21st-century Irish historians
Irish women non-fiction writers
Irish medievalists
Members of the Royal Irish Academy
Academics of the Dublin Institute for Advanced Studies